Garganus fusiformis is a species of plant bug in the family Miridae. It is found in North America.

References

Further reading

 

Mirini
Hemiptera of North America
Taxa named by Thomas Say
Insects described in 1832
Articles created by Qbugbot